State Route 135 (SR 135) is a short north–south state highway in the southwestern portion of the U.S. state of Ohio.

Route description
The entirety of SR 135 is located within the western portion of Highland County. Beginning at a T-intersection with US 50 in Dodson Township, SR 135 travels to the northwest through a landscape primarily composed of farmland, with a few homes appearing along the way. After a brief westerly overlap of Anderson Road, the state route turns north, passes some patches of trees just prior to passing into Lynchburg. SR 135 bends to the north-northwest as it follows Sycamore Street through a residential neighborhood. The highway then turns west onto South Street at a four-way stop intersection, and continues through the heavily residential portion of the village through its endpoint where it meets SR 134 at a T-intersection.

SR 135 is not included as a component of the National Highway System.

History
The SR 135 designation was created in 1923. It has maintained the same short alignment in western Highland County throughout its history.  The only change of any significance is that the route intersecting SR 135 at its southern terminus prior to the coming of US 50 was originally designated as SR 26. At its northern terminus, SR 135 has always intersected SR 134.

Pop Culture Reference:

This route is mentioned in an episode of Seinfeld ("The Bottle Deposit, Part II") where Kramer and Newman are following Jerry's stolen Saab convertible through Ohio on their way to Michigan in a mail truck full of bottles to recycle.

Major intersections

References

135
Transportation in Highland County, Ohio